Gekkō (月光 "moonlight") is a DVD released by Japanese singer Gackt on August 6, 2003.

DVD Content 
 Kimi Ga Oikaketa Yume
 Kimi Ga Oikaketa Yume [Making of]
 Tsuki no Uta
 Tsuki no Uta [Making of]
 Special Track
- Gackt in Hawaii 
- Birthday prank on Ren

References

2003 video albums
Gackt video albums
Music video compilation albums
2003 compilation albums